is an officially commissioned Japanese history text. Completed in 840, it is the third volume in the Six National Histories. It covers the years 792–833.

Background

Following the earlier national history Shoku Nihongi (797), in 819 Emperor Saga ordered the compilation of the years since then. Primarily edited by Fujiwara no Otsugu, Minamoto no Tokiwa, Fujiwara no Yoshino and Fujiwara no Yoshifusa, the text was completed in 840.

Much of the text was lost during the Ōnin and Bunmei Wars in the late 15th century. Of the original 40 volumes, only ten currently exist: 5, 8, 12, 13, 14, 17, 20–22, and 24.

Contents

Written in kanbun-style, the contents covered the years 792 through 833. It spans four imperial reigns: Kanmu, Heizei, Saga, Junna. The text is characteristic in that it contains criticism of emperors and officials as well as poetry.

See also

 Ruijū Kokushi, a categorized and chronological history text of the Six National Histories; valuable resource in recreating the missing contents of the Nihon Kōki

References

External links
Text of the Nihon Kōki (Japanese)
Manuscript scans, Waseda University Library

Late Old Japanese texts
9th-century history books
Heian period in literature
History books about Japan
Nara period
9th century in Japan
9th-century Japanese books
History books of the Heian Period